Toboliu (Hungarian: Vizesgyán) is a commune located in Bihor County, Crișana, Romania. Established in 2007 when it was split from Girișu de Criș Commune, it is composed of two villages, Cheresig (Körösszeg) and Toboliu.

At the 2011 census, 90.1% of inhabitants were Romanians, 6.6% Roma and 2.9% Hungarians.

References

Communes in Bihor County
Localities in Crișana